The commune of Gisuru is a commune of Ruyigi Province in eastern Burundi. The capital lies at Gisuru.

References

Communes of Burundi
Ruyigi Province